Magnago is a comune (municipality) in the Province of Milan in the Italian region Lombardy, located about  northwest of Milan.

Magnago borders the following municipalities: Samarate, Busto Arsizio, Vanzaghello, Dairago, Castano Primo, Buscate.

References

External links
 Official website

Cities and towns in Lombardy